Rishton may refer to:

Places

Rishton, a town in Lancashire, England
Rishton, Uzbekistan, a town in the Fergana Valley, Uzbekistan

People
Edward Rishton
John Rishton, CEO of the Dutch company Ahold
Tim Rishton, musician